Tajan may refer to:
 Tajan, Gilan
 Tajan Gukeh, Gilan Province
 Tajan, South Khorasan
 Tajan Rural District, in Razavi Khorasan Province